Hurricane Isbell spawned one of the most significant tornado outbreaks to strike the Miami metropolitan area on October 14, 1964. It produced at least nine confirmed, and possibly as many as 17, tornadoes, four of which were rated significant (F2) on the Fujita scale. Although there were no fatalities, 48 people were injured and losses totaled $560,250. The most damaging of the tornadoes was an estimated F2 that injured 22 people at a mobile home park in Briny Breezes, causing $250,000 in losses.

Background
At 21:00 UTC on October 14, 1964, Hurricane Isbell made landfall near Everglades City as a Category 2 with maximum sustained winds of 105 mph (165 km/h), having weakened somewhat from its estimated peak intensity of 115 mph (185 km/h). It quickly crossed over South Florida, spending five hours over land prior to entering the Atlantic Ocean. Much of the damage associated with the storm in South Florida was attributable to a series of tornadoes that affected the region. The tornadoes—estimates of which range from 13–17—were responsible for all injuries that occurred during the passage of the storm.

Confirmed tornadoes

See also
List of North American tornadoes and tornado outbreaks
List of tornadoes spawned by tropical cyclones

Notes

References

Sources

 
 

 

F2 tornadoes
Tornadoes of 1964
Tornadoes in Florida
1964 in Florida